The New Zealand Warriors 2007 season was the New Zealand Warriors 13th first-grade season. The club competed in Australasia's National Rugby League. The coach of the team was Ivan Cleary while Steve Price was the club's captain.

Milestones
25 March - Round 2: Evarn Tuimavave made his 50th appearance for the club.
8 April - Round 4: Logan Swann became the third player to play 150 first grade games for the Warriors.
5 May - Round 8: Nathan Fien made his 50th appearance for the club.
20 May - Round 10: Ruben Wiki made his 50th appearance for the club.
3 June - Round 12: Tony Martin made his 50th appearance for the club.
7 July - Round 17: Manu Vatuvei and Steve Price made their 50th appearances for the club.
26 August - Round 24: Wairangi Koopu made his 150th appearance for the club and Epalahame Lauaki made his 50th appearance for the club.
16 September - Semi Final: Micheal Luck and Simon Mannering made their 50th appearances for the club.

Jersey & Sponsors

Fixtures 

The Warriors used Mt Smart Stadium as their home ground in 2007, their only home ground since they entered the competition in 1995.

Trial Matches

Regular season

Finals

Ladder

Squad 

Twenty three players were used by the club in 2007. Four players made their debuts for the club, although only one (Corey Lawrie) made his National Rugby League debut. In addition Aidan Kirk was in the squad but did not play a game due to injury.

Staff
Chief Executive Officer: Wayne Scurrah

NRL Staff
Head coach: Ivan Cleary
Assistant coach: John Ackland
Welfare and Development Coach: Tony Iro
In August 2007 Dean Bell was appointed the club's Development Manager with the intention that he would manage the Toyota Cup (Under-20s) team from 2008.
Trainer: Craig Walker

Transfers

Gains

Losses

Mid-Season Losses

Other Teams

Senior players who were not required for the first team played with the Auckland Lions in the NSWRL Premier League. Graeme Norton coached the side which finished in tenth spot (out of thirteen), just two wins outside of the top eight.

The Auckland Lions featured many players who were yet to make their first grade debuts for the Warriors, such as Leeson Ah Mau, Sonny Fai, Isaac John, Aidan Kirk, Kevin Locke, Russell Packer and Malo Solomona.

Awards
Steve Price won the Player of the Year award.

References

External links
Warriors official site
NRL 2007 - Warriors rugbyleagueproject.org

New Zealand Warriors seasons
New Zealand Warriors season
War